Below is the list of populated places in Tokat Province, Turkey by the districts. In the following lists, first place in each list is the administrative center of the district.

Tokat
 Tokat
 Acıpınar, Tokat
 Ahmetalan, Tokat
 Akbelen, Tokat
 Akın, Tokat
 Akyamaç, Tokat
 Akyurt, Tokat
 Alan, Tokat
 Altuntaş, Tokat
 Aluç, Tokat
 Aşağıfırındere, Tokat
 Avlunlar, Tokat
 Avşarağzı, Tokat
 Aydınca, Tokat
 Aydoğdu, Tokat
 Bağbaşı, Tokat
 Bakışlı, Tokat
 Ballıdere, Tokat
 Batmantaş, Tokat
 Bedirkale, Tokat
 Beşören, Tokat
 Boyalı, Tokat
 Bula, Tokat
 Büyükbağlar, Tokat
 Büyükyıldız, Tokat
 Çamağzı, Tokat
 Çamaltı, Tokat
 Çamdere, Tokat
 Çamlıbel, Tokat
 Çamlık, Tokat
 Çat, Tokat
 Çatalkaya, Tokat
 Çayören, Tokat
 Çerçi, Tokat
 Çerdiğin, Tokat
 Çökelikkışla, Tokat
 Çördük, Tokat
 Çöreğibüyük, Tokat
 Çubuklu, Tokat
 Daylıhacı, Tokat
 Dedeli, Tokat
 Dereağzı, Tokat
 Derekışla, Tokat
 Dereyaka, Tokat
 Dodurga, Tokat
 Döllük, Tokat
 Efe, Tokat
 Ekincilik, Tokat
 Emirseyit, Tokat
 Eski, Tokat
 Gaziosmanpaşa, Tokat
 Gökçe, Tokat
 Gökdere, Tokat
 Gölcük, Tokat
 Gözova, Tokat
 Güğünlü, Tokat
 Gülpınar, Tokat
 Günçalı, Tokat
 Günevi, Tokat
 Güryıldız, Tokat
 Güzelce, Tokat
 Güzeldere, Tokat
 Halilalan, Tokat
 Hanpınar, Tokat
 Hasanbaba, Tokat
 İhsaniye, Tokat
 Kabakboğazı, Tokat
 Kabatepe, Tokat
 Kadıvakfı, Tokat
 Karakaya, Tokat
 Karkın, Tokat
 Karkıncık, Tokat
 Kemalpaşa, Tokat
 Kervansaray, Tokat
 Keşlik, Tokat
 Kılıçlı, Tokat
 Kızık, Tokat
 Kızılkaya, Tokat
 Kızılköy, Tokat
 Kızılöz, Tokat
 Killik, Tokat
 Kocacık, Tokat
 Kömeç, Tokat
 Küçükbağlar, Tokat
 Musullu, Tokat
 Mülk, Tokat
 Nebi, Tokat
 Ormanbeyli, Tokat
 Ortaören, Tokat
 Pınarlı, Tokat
 Sarıtarla, Tokat
 Semerci, Tokat
 Sevindik, Tokat
 Söngüt, Tokat
 Şehitler, Tokat
 Şenköy, Tokat
 Tahtuba, Tokat
 Taşlıçiftlik, Tokat
 Tekneli, Tokat
 Uğrak, Tokat
 Ulaş, Tokat
 Yağmurlu, Tokat
 Yakacık, Tokat
 Yatmış, Tokat
 Yayladalı, Tokat
 Yazıbaşı, Tokat
 Yelpe, Tokat
 Yenice, Tokat
 Yeşilyurt (village), Tokat

Almus

 Almus
 Akarçay, Almus
 Alanköy, Almus
 Arısu, Almus
 Ataköy, Almus
 Babaköy, Almus
 Bağtaşı, Almus
 Bakımlı, Almus
 Cihet, Almus
 Çambulak, Almus
 Çamdalı, Almus
 Çamköy, Almus
 Çaykıyı, Almus
 Çayönü, Almus
 Çevreli, Almus
 Çiftlik, Almus
 Çilehane, Almus
 Dereköy, Almus
 Dikili, Almus
 Durudere, Almus
 Gebeli, Almus
 Gölgeli, Almus
 Görümlü, Almus
 Gümeleönü, Almus
 Hubyar, Almus
 Kapıcı, Almus
 Karadere, Almus
 Kınık, Almus
 Kızılelma, Almus
 Kolköy, Almus
 Kuruseki, Almus
 Mescitköy, Almus
 Oğulbey, Almus
 Ormandibi, Almus
 Sağırlar, Almus
 Sahilköy, Almus
 Sarıören, Almus
 Serince, Almus
 Teknecik, Almus
 Üçgöl, Almus

Artova

 Artova
 Ağmusa, Artova
 Ahmetdanişment, Artova
 Aktaş, Artova
 Aşağıgüçlü, Artova
 Bayırlı, Artova
 Bebekderesi, Artova
 Boyunpınar, Artova
 Çelikli, Artova
 Devecikargın, Artova
 Evlideresi, Artova
 Gazipınarı, Artova
 Gümüşyurt, Artova
 Gürardıç, Artova
 İğdir, Artova
 Mertekli, Artova
 Kayaönü, Artova
 Kunduz, Artova
 Kunduzağılı, Artova
 Poyrazalan, Artova
 Sağlıca, Artova
 Salur, Artova
 Tanyeli, Artova
 Taşpınar, Artova
 Tuzla, Artova
 Ulusulu, Artova
 Yağcımusa, Artova
 Yenice, Artova
 Yukarıgüçlü, Artova

Başçiftlik

 Başçiftlik
 Alan, Başçiftlik
 Aydoğmuş, Başçiftlik
 Dağüstü, Başçiftlik
 Erikbelen, Başçiftlik
 Hatipli, Başçiftlik
 Sarıağıl, Başçiftlik
 Şahnaalan, Başçiftlik
 Yeşilçam, Başçiftlik

Erbaa

 Erbaa
 Ağcaalan, Erbaa
 Ağcakeçi, Erbaa
 Akça, Erbaa
 Akgün, Erbaa
 Alan, Erbaa
 Aşağıçandır, Erbaa
 Ayan, Erbaa
 Aydınsofu, Erbaa
 Bağpınar, Erbaa
 Ballıbağ, Erbaa
 Benli, Erbaa
 Beykaya, Erbaa
 Canbolat, Erbaa
 Cibril, Erbaa
 Çakır, Erbaa
 Çalkara, Erbaa
 Çamdibi, Erbaa
 Çatalan, Erbaa
 Çatılı, Erbaa
 Çerkezfındıcak, Erbaa
 Çeşmeli, Erbaa
 Çevresu, Erbaa
 Değirmenli, Erbaa
 Demirtaş, Erbaa
 Doğanyurt, Erbaa
 Dokuzçam, Erbaa
 Endikpınar, Erbaa
 Engelli, Erbaa
 Erdemli, Erbaa
 Ermeydanı, Erbaa
 Eryaba, Erbaa
 Evciler, Erbaa
 Ezebağı, Erbaa
 Gökal, Erbaa
 Gölönü, Erbaa
 Gümüşalan, Erbaa
 Güveçli, Erbaa
 Hacıali, Erbaa
 Hacıbükü, Erbaa
 Hacıpazar, Erbaa
 İkizce, Erbaa
 İverönü, Erbaa
 Kale, Erbaa
 Karaağaç, Erbaa
 Karayaka, Erbaa
 Kartosman, Erbaa
 Kavalcık, Erbaa
 Keçeci, Erbaa
 Kırıkgüney, Erbaa
 Kızılçubuk, Erbaa
 Koçak, Erbaa
 Kozlu, Erbaa
 Kurtuluş, Erbaa
 Kuz, Erbaa
 Küplüce, Erbaa
 Madenli, Erbaa
 Meydandüzü, Erbaa
 Narlıdere, Erbaa
 Ocakbaşı, Erbaa
 Oğlakçı, Erbaa
 Ortaköy, Erbaa
 Pınarbeyli, Erbaa
 Salkımören, Erbaa
 Sokutaş, Erbaa
 Sütlüce, Erbaa
 Şükür, Erbaa
 Tandırlı, Erbaa
 Tanoba, Erbaa
 Tepekışla, Erbaa
 Tosunlar, Erbaa
 Türkfındıcak, Erbaa
 Ustamehmet, Erbaa
 Üzümlü, Erbaa
 Yaylacık, Erbaa
 Yaylalı, Erbaa
 Yoldere, Erbaa
 Yukarıçandır, Erbaa
 Yurdalan, Erbaa
 Zoğallıçukur, Erbaa

Niksar

 Niksar
 Akgüney, Niksar
 Akıncı, Niksar
 Araköy, Niksar
 Ardıçlı, Niksar
 Arıpınar, Niksar
 Arpaören, Niksar
 Asar, Niksar
 Ayvalı, Niksar
 Bayraktepe, Niksar
 Beyçayırı, Niksar
 Bilgili, Niksar
 Boğazbaşı, Niksar
 Boyluca, Niksar
 Bozcaarmut, Niksar
 Budaklı, Niksar
 Buz, Niksar
 Büyükyurt, Niksar
 Camidere, Niksar
 Cerköy, Niksar
 Çalca, Niksar
 Çatak, Niksar
 Çay, Niksar
 Çiçekli, Niksar
 Çimenözü, Niksar
 Dalkaya, Niksar
 Derindere, Niksar
 Direkli, Niksar
 Edilli, Niksar
 Eryaba, Niksar
 Esence, Niksar
 Eyneağzı, Niksar
 Gerit, Niksar
 Geyikgölü, Niksar
 Gökçeli, Niksar
 Gökçeoluk, Niksar
 Gözpınar, Niksar
 Güdüklü, Niksar
 Gülbayır, Niksar
 Gültepe, Niksar
 Günebakan, Niksar
 Günlüce, Niksar
 Gürçeşme, Niksar
 Güvenli, Niksar
 Güzelyayla, Niksar
 Hacılı, Niksar
 Hanyeri, Niksar
 Haydarbey, Niksar
 Hüseyingazi, Niksar
 Işıklı, Niksar
 Kapıağzı, Niksar
 Karabodur, Niksar
 Karakaş, Niksar
 Kaşıkcı, Niksar
 Kiracı, Niksar
 Korulu, Niksar
 Köklüce, Niksar
 Kumçiftlik, Niksar
 Kuyucak, Niksar
 Kümbetli, Niksar
 Mahmudiye, Niksar
 Mercimekdüzü, Niksar
 Mezra, Niksar
 Muhtardüzü, Niksar
 Musapınarı, Niksar
 Mutluca, Niksar
 Oluklu, Niksar
 Ormancık, Niksar
 Osmaniye, Niksar
 Örenler, Niksar
 Özalan, Niksar
 Özdemir, Niksar
 Pelitli, Niksar
 Sarıyazı, Niksar
 Serenli, Niksar
 Sorhun, Niksar
 Sulugöl, Niksar
 Şahinli, Niksar
 Şıhlar, Niksar
 Tahtalı, Niksar
 Teknealan, Niksar
 Tepeyatak, Niksar
 Terzioğlu, Niksar
 Umurlu, Niksar
 Ustahasan, Niksar
 Yakınca, Niksar
 Yalıköy, Niksar
 Yarbaşı, Niksar
 Yazıcık, Niksar
 Yeşilhisar, Niksar
 Yeşilkaya, Niksar
 Yeşilköy, Niksar
 Yeşilyurt, Niksar
 Yolkonak, Niksar

Pazar

 Pazar
 Bağlarbaşı, Pazar
 Ballıca, Pazar
 Beşevler, Pazar
 Çayköy, Pazar
 Çiftlikköy, Pazar
 Dereçaylı, Pazar
 Dereköy, Pazar
 Doğancalı, Pazar
 Kaledere, Pazar
 Menteşe, Pazar
 Ocaklı, Pazar
 Ovacık, Pazar
 Ovayurt, Pazar
 Taşlık, Pazar
 Tatarköy, Pazar
 Tepeçaylı, Pazar
 Üzümören, Pazar

Reşadiye

 Reşadiye
 Abdurrahmanlı, Reşadiye
 Akdoğmuş, Reşadiye
 Altıparmak, Reşadiye
 Bağdatlı, Reşadiye
 Baydarlı, Reşadiye
 Bayırbaşı, Reşadiye
 Bereketli, Reşadiye
 Beşdere, Reşadiye
 Bostankolu, Reşadiye
 Bozçalı, Reşadiye
 Büşürüm, Reşadiye
 Cimitekke, Reşadiye
 Çakırlı, Reşadiye
 Çakmak, Reşadiye
 Çakraz, Reşadiye
 Çambalı, Reşadiye
 Çamlıkaya, Reşadiye
 Çat, Reşadiye
 Çavuşbeyli, Reşadiye
 Çayırpınar, Reşadiye
 Çevrecik, Reşadiye
 Çınarcık, Reşadiye
 Dalpınar, Reşadiye
 Danişment, Reşadiye
 Darıdere, Reşadiye
 Demircili, Reşadiye
 Dolay, Reşadiye
 Döllük, Reşadiye
 Dutdibi, Reşadiye
 Elmacık, Reşadiye
 Esenköy, Reşadiye
 Eymür, Reşadiye
 Eyüp, Reşadiye
 Gökköy, Reşadiye
 Göllüköy, Reşadiye
 Gurbetli, Reşadiye
 Gülburnu, Reşadiye
 Gülkonak, Reşadiye
 Güllüce, Reşadiye
 Güneygölcük, Reşadiye
 Güvendik, Reşadiye
 Güzeldere, Reşadiye
 Hasanşeyh, Reşadiye
 Hebüllü, Reşadiye
 İbrahimşeyh, Reşadiye
 İslamlı, Reşadiye
 İsmailiye, Reşadiye
 Kabalı, Reşadiye
 Kapaklı, Reşadiye
 Karacaağaç, Reşadiye
 Karataş, Reşadiye
 Karlıyayla, Reşadiye
 Karşıkent, Reşadiye
 Kaşpınar, Reşadiye
 Keteniği, Reşadiye
 Kızılcaören, Reşadiye
 Konak, Reşadiye
 Köklü, Reşadiye
 Kuyucak, Reşadiye
 Kuzbağı, Reşadiye
 Kuzgölcük, Reşadiye
 Muratkaya, Reşadiye
 Nebişeyh, Reşadiye
 Özen, Reşadiye
 Özlüce, Reşadiye
 Saraykışla, Reşadiye
 Sarıyayla, Reşadiye
 Sazak, Reşadiye
 Soğukpınar, Reşadiye
 Taşlıca, Reşadiye
 Toklar, Reşadiye
 Tozanlıfındıcak, Reşadiye
 Uğurlu, Reşadiye
 Umurca, Reşadiye
 Yağsiyan, Reşadiye
 Yenituraç, Reşadiye
 Yeşilyurt, Reşadiye
 Yoğunpelit, Reşadiye
 Yolüstü, Reşadiye
 Yuvacık, Reşadiye

Sulusaray

 Sulusaray
 Alanyurt, Sulusaray
 Alpudere, Sulusaray
 Arpacıkaraçay, Sulusaray
 Balıkhisar, Sulusaray
 Ballıkaya, Sulusaray
 Bayazıt, Sulusaray
 Belpınar, Sulusaray
 Buğdaylı, Sulusaray
 Çime, Sulusaray
 Dutluca, Sulusaray
 Ilıcak, Sulusaray
 Sarıyaprak, Sulusaray
 Selimiye, Sulusaray
 Tekkeyeni, Sulusaray
 Uylubağı, Sulusaray

Turhal

 Turhal
 Ağcaşar, Turhal
 Akbuğday, Turhal
 Akçatarla, Turhal
 Arzupınar, Turhal
 Ataköy, Turhal
 Ayranpınar, Turhal
 Bahçebaşı, Turhal
 Buzluk, Turhal
 Çamlıca, Turhal
 Çarıksız, Turhal
 Çayıraltı, Turhal
 Çaylı, Turhal
 Çivril, Turhal
 Derbentçi, Turhal
 Dökmetepe, Turhal
 Elalmış, Turhal
 Erenli, Turhal
 Eriklitekke, Turhal
 Gökdere, Turhal
 Gümüştop, Turhal
 Hamide, Turhal
 Hasanlı, Turhal
 Kamalı, Turhal
 Karkın, Turhal
 Kat, Turhal
 Kayaören, Turhal
 Kazancı, Turhal
 Kızkayası, Turhal
 Koruluk, Turhal
 Kuşoturağı, Turhal
 Kuytul, Turhal
 Kuzalan, Turhal
 Necip, Turhal
 Ormanözü, Turhal
 Ovalı, Turhal
 Samurçay, Turhal
 Sarıçiçek, Turhal
 Sarıkaya, Turhal
 Sütlüce, Turhal
 Şatroba, Turhal
 Şenyurt, Turhal
 Taşlıhöyük, Turhal
 Tatlıcak, Turhal
 Uluöz, Turhal
 Ulutepe, Turhal
 Üçyol, Turhal
 Yağlıalan, Turhal
 Yazıtepe, Turhal
 Yeniceler, Turhal
 Yeniköy, Turhal
 Yenisu, Turhal
 Yeşilalan, Turhal

Yeşilyurt

 Yeşilyurt
 Bahçebaşı, Yeşilyurt
 Büğet, Yeşilyurt
 Çıkrık, Yeşilyurt
 Çırdak, Yeşilyurt
 Damlalı, Yeşilyurt
 Doğanca, Yeşilyurt
 Doğlacık, Yeşilyurt
 Ekinli, Yeşilyurt
 Gündoğan, Yeşilyurt
 Karacaören, Yeşilyurt
 Karagözgöllüalan, Yeşilyurt
 Karaoluk, Yeşilyurt
 Kavunluk, Yeşilyurt
 Kuşçu, Yeşilyurt
 Sekücek, Yeşilyurt
 Sivri, Yeşilyurt
 Yağmur, Yeşilyurt
 Yeniköy, Yeşilyurt

Zile

 Zile
 Acıpınar, Zile
 Acısu, Zile
 Ağcakeçili, Zile
 Ağılcık, Zile
 Akdoğan, Zile
 Akgüller, Zile
 Akkılıç, Zile
 Alıçözü, Zile
 Alibağı, Zile
 Alihoca, Zile
 Armutalan, Zile
 Ayvalı, Zile
 Bağlarpınarı, Zile
 Bayır, Zile
 Belkaya, Zile
 Belpınar, Zile
 Binbaşıoğlu, Zile
 Boldacı, Zile
 Büyükaköz, Zile
 Büyükkarayün, Zile
 Büyükkozluca, Zile
 Büyüközlü, Zile
 Çakırcalı, Zile
 Çamdere, Zile
 Çapak, Zile
 Çayır, Zile
 Çayıroluğu, Zile
 Çeltek, Zile
 Çiçekpınarı, Zile
 Derebaşı, Zile
 Ede, Zile
 Elmacık, Zile
 Emirören, Zile
 Eskidağiçi, Zile
 Eskiderbent, Zile
 Evrenköy, Zile
 Fatih, Zile
 Göçenli, Zile
 Gölcük, Zile
 Güblüce, Zile
 Gümüşkaş, Zile
 Güngörmez, Zile
 Güzelbeyli, Zile
 Hacılar, Zile
 Haramikışla, Zile
 Hasanağa, Zile
 Hatippınarı, Zile
 İğdir, Zile
 İmirtolu, Zile
 Karabalçık, Zile
 Karacaören, Zile
 Karakaya, Zile
 Karakuzu, Zile
 Karaşeyh, Zile
 Karşıpınar, Zile
 Kazıklı, Zile
 Kepez, Zile
 Kervansaray, Zile
 Kırlar, Zile
 Kireçli, Zile
 Koçaş, Zile
 Korucuk, Zile
 Kozdere, Zile
 Köylüünürü, Zile
 Kurşunlu, Zile
 Kuruçay, Zile
 Kurupınar, Zile
 Kuzalan, Zile
 Küçükaköz, Zile
 Küçükkarayün, Zile
 Küçükkozluca, Zile
 Küçüközlü, Zile
 Narlıkışla, Zile
 Olukman, Zile
 Osmanpınarı, Zile
 Özyurt, Zile
 Palanlı, Zile
 Reşadiye, Zile
 Salur, Zile
 Saraç, Zile
 Savcu, Zile
 Sekikışla, Zile
 Selamet, Zile
 Sofular, Zile
 Söğütözü, Zile
 Süleymaniye, Zile
 Şeyhköy, Zile
 Şeyhnusrettin, Zile
 Taşkıran, Zile
 Turgutalp, Zile
 Uğurluören, Zile
 Uzunköy, Zile
 Uzunöz, Zile
 Üçkaya, Zile
 Üçköy, Zile
 Ütük, Zile
 Üyük, Zile
 Yalınyazı, Zile
 Yalnızköy, Zile
 Yapalak, Zile
 Yaraş, Zile
 Yaylakent, Zile
 Yaylayolu, Zile
 Yenidağiçi, Zile
 Yeniderbent, Zile
 Yeniköy, Zile
 Yeşilce, Zile
 Yıldıztepe, Zile
 Yücepınar, Zile
 Yünlü, Zile

References

Tokat Province
Tokat
List